Daphne Matziaraki is a Greek director, writer and producer, graduated from University of California, Berkeley. Her thesis-film 4.1 Miles (with Kyriakos Papadopoulos) received critical appraisal and recognition earning her a Gold Medal at 43rd Annual Student Academy Awards, The film went onto receive a nomination for Academy Award for Best Documentary (Short Subject) at the 89th Academy Awards.

Filmography
 2014: Frontline TV Series documentary, production assistant - 1 episode
 2015: Independent Lens - TV Series documentary, intern - 1 episode
 2016: 4.1 Miles - director, writer, producer, cinematographer, editor

Awards and nominations
 Nominated: Academy Award for Best Documentary (Short Subject)
 Won: Peabody Award
 Won: International Documentary Association
 Gold Medal: Student Academy Award for Best Documentary

References

External links
 
 

Living people
Greek film producers
Greek film directors
Year of birth missing (living people)
UC Berkeley Graduate School of Journalism alumni
Film people from Athens